The Standing Rules of the Senate are the parliamentary procedures adopted by the United States Senate that govern its procedure. The Senate's power to establish rules derives from Article One, Section5 of the United States Constitution: "Each House may determine the rules of its proceedings..."

There are currently forty-five rules, with the latest revision adopted on January 24, 2013. The most recent addition of a new rule occurred in 2006, when The Legislative Transparency and Accountability Act of 2006 introduced a 44th rule on earmarks. The stricter rules are often waived by unanimous consent.

Outline of rules

Quorum
The Constitution provides that a majority of the Senate constitutes a quorum to do business. Under the rules and customs of the Senate, a quorum is always assumed to be present unless a quorum call explicitly demonstrates otherwise. Any senator may request a quorum call by "suggesting the absence of a quorum"; a clerk then calls the roll of the Senate and notes which members are present. In practice, senators almost always request quorum calls not to establish the presence of a quorum, but to temporarily delay proceedings without having to adjourn the session. Such a delay may serve one of many purposes; often, it allows Senate leaders to negotiate compromises off the floor or to allow senators time to come to the Senate floor to make speeches without having to constantly be present in the chamber while waiting for the opportunity. Once the need for a delay has ended, any senator may request unanimous consent to rescind the quorum call.

Debate
The Senate is presided over by the Presiding Officer, either the President of the Senate (the Vice President) or more often the President pro tempore (in special cases the Chief Justice presides). During debates, senators may speak only if called upon by the Presiding Officer. The Presiding Officer is, however, required to recognize the first senator who rises to speak. Thus, the Presiding Officer has little control over the course of debate. Customarily, the majority leader and minority leader are accorded priority during debates, even if another senator rises first. All speeches must be addressed to the Presiding Officer, using the words "Mr. President" or "Madam President". Only the Presiding Officer may be directly addressed in speeches; other members must be referred to in the third person. In most cases, senators refer to each other not by name, but by state, using forms such as "the senior senator from Virginia" or "the junior senator from California".

There are very few restrictions on the content of speeches, and there is no requirement that speeches be germane to the matter before the Senate.

The Senate Rules provide that no senator may make more than two speeches on a motion or bill on the same legislative day (a legislative day begins when the Senate convenes and ends when it adjourns; hence, it does not necessarily coincide with the calendar day). The length of these speeches is not limited by the rules; thus, in most cases, senators may speak for as long as they please. Often, the Senate adopts unanimous consent agreements imposing time limits. In other cases (for example, for the budget process), limits are imposed by statute. In general, however, the right to unlimited debate is preserved.

Filibuster

The filibuster is an obstructionary tactic used to defeat bills and motions by prolonging debate indefinitely. A filibuster may entail, but does not actually require, long speeches, dilatory motions, and an extensive series of proposed amendments. The longest filibuster speech in the history of the Senate was delivered by Strom Thurmond, who spoke for over twenty-four hours in an unsuccessful attempt to block the passage of the Civil Rights Act of 1957. The Senate may end a filibuster by invoking cloture. In most cases, cloture requires the support of three-fifths of the Senate. Cloture is invoked very rarely, particularly because bipartisan support is usually necessary to obtain the required supermajority. If the Senate does invoke cloture, debate does not end immediately; instead, further debate is limited to thirty additional hours unless increased by another three-fifths vote.

Closed session

On occasion, the Senate may go into what is called a secret or closed session. During a closed session, the chamber doors are closed and the galleries are completely cleared of anyone not sworn to secrecy, not instructed in the rules of the closed session, or not essential to the session. Closed sessions are rare and are usually held only under certain circumstances in which the Senate is discussing sensitive subject matter, such as information critical to national security, private communications from the president, or discussions of Senate deliberations during impeachment trials. Any Senator has the right to call a closed session as long as the motion is seconded.

Voting
When debate concludes, the motion in question is put to a vote. In many cases, the Senate votes by voice vote; the presiding officer puts the question, and Members respond either "Aye!" (in favor of the motion) or "No!" (against the motion). The presiding officer then announces the result of the voice vote. Any senator, however, may challenge the presiding officer's assessment and request a recorded vote. The request may be granted only if it is seconded by one-fifth of the senators present. In practice, however, senators second requests for recorded votes as a matter of courtesy. When a recorded vote is held, the clerk calls the roll of the Senate in alphabetical order; each senator responds when their name is called. Senators who miss the roll call may still cast a vote as long as the recorded vote remains open. The vote is closed at the discretion of the presiding officer but must remain open for a minimum of fifteen minutes. If the vote is tied, the Vice President, if present, is entitled to a casting vote. If the Vice President is not present, however, the motion is resolved in the negative.

Committees

Tasks in the Senate are divided among sixteen standing committees, four select committees, four joint committees, and occasionally temporary committees. Senate rules establish the policy jurisdictions of each committee; for example, the Committee on Foreign Relations deals with all matters relating to foreign policy. Committees act, in effect, as "little legislatures", monitoring ongoing governmental operations, identifying issues suitable for legislative review, gathering and evaluating information, and recommending courses of action to their parent body in matters relating to their jurisdiction. Senate rules give committees significant gatekeeping authority over legislation that falls under their jurisdiction, with proposed bills submitted to the relevant committee, which can hold hearings, "mark up" bills, consolidate bills into a "clean bill", or ignore the bill altogether (there exist some workarounds for Senators to circumvent committees, but in general Senators work through the committee system).

The size of each standing committee is established by Senate rules. The makeup of committees are established through inter-party negotiations before each new Congress, with the percentage of a party's representation within the Senate determining the percentage of seats it will have on each committee.

Reconciliation

Legislation affecting spending, revenues, and the federal debt limit is governed under a special rules process called "Reconciliation" that prohibits filibusters by limiting debate to twenty hours. Congress can pass up to three reconciliation bills per year, with each bill addressing one of the topics of reconciliation (revenue, spending, or the debt limit). However, if Congress passes a reconciliation bill affecting more than one of those topics, it cannot pass another reconciliation bill later in the year affecting one of the topics addressed by the previous reconciliation bill. In practice, reconciliation bills have usually been passed once per year at most. Reconciliation cannot be used to enact or rescind discretionary spending (which is controlled through the annual appropriations process) or adjust Social Security spending, and is limited by the Byrd Rule, which allows senators to block provisions that are "extraneous" to spending, revenues, or the debt limit.

Reconciliation was created by the Congressional Budget Act of 1974, and significantly altered with the introduction of the Byrd Rule in 1985 (amended in 1990). Originally infrequently used (it did not see first use until 1980).

Rules by number
There are currently forty-four Standing Rules of the Senate:
SR Rule I: Appointment of a Senator to the Chair
SR Rule II: Presentation of Credentials and Questions of Privilege
SR Rule III: Oaths
SR Rule IV: Commencement of Daily Sessions
SR Rule V: Suspension and Amendment of the Rules
SR Rule VI: Quorum – Absent Senators May Be Sent For
SR Rule VII: Morning Business
SR Rule VIII: Order of Business
SR Rule IX: Messages
SR Rule X: Special Orders
SR Rule XI: Papers – Withdrawal, Printing, Reading of, and Reference 
SR Rule XII: Voting Procedure 
SR Rule XIII: Reconsideration
SR Rule XIV: Joint Resolutions, and Preambles Thereto
SR Rule XV: Amendments and Resolutions
SR Rule XVI: Appropriations and Amendments to General Appropriation Bills
SR Rule XVII: Reference to Committees; Motions to Discharge; Reports of Committees; and Hearings Available
SR Rule XVIII: Business Continued from Session to Session
SR Rule XIX: Debate
SR Rule XX: Questions for Order
SR Rule XXI: Session with Closed Doors
SR Rule XXII: Precedence of Motions
SR Rule XXIII: Privilege of the Floor
SR Rule XXIV: Appointments of Committee
SR Rule XXV: Standing Committees
SR Rule XXVI: Committee Procedure
SR Rule XXVII: Committee Staff
SR Rule XXVIII: Conference Committees; Reports; Open Meetings 
SR Rule XXIX: Executive Sessions
SR Rule XXX: Executive Session – Proceedings on Treaties 
SR Rule XXXI: Executive Session – Proceedings on Nominations
SR Rule XXXII: The President Furnished with Copies of Record Executive Sessions
SR Rule XXXIII: Senate Chamber – Senate Wing of the Capitol
SR Rule XXXIV: Public Financial Disclosure
SR Rule XXXV: Gifts
SR Rule XXXVI: Outside Earned Income
SR Rule XXXVII: Conflict of Interest
SR Rule XXXVIII: Prohibition of Unofficial Office Accounts
SR Rule XXXIX: Foreign Travel
SR Rule XL: Franking Privilege and Radio and Television Studios
SR Rule XLI: Political Fund Activity; Definitions
SR Rule XLII: Employment Practices
SR Rule XLIII: Representation by Members
SR Rule XLIV: Congressionally Directed Spending and Related Items

The latest change was the introduction in 2006 of a 44th rule on earmarks, by the Legislative Transparency and Accountability Act.

References

External links

Official text, Standing Rules of the Senate 
Standing Rules of the Senate, One Hundred Thirteenth Congress, November 4, 2013 (PDF format)

 
Parliamentary procedure
United States Senate